Chichester Free School is a mixed-sex free school located in Chichester, West Sussex, England. It opened in 2013 and caters for students aged 4–16 years. The school is located on the newly re-developed Carmelite convent site, which was damaged in a fire in 2009.

Academic performance

In 2019, 34% of pupils achieved Grade 5+ in English and Maths GCSEs, compared to 43% nationally and locally. The school's Attainment 8 Score was 44, compared to 47 nationally and locally. 64% of pupils were entered for the English Baccalaureate, compared to 40% nationally and locally.

Ofsted judgements

In June 2015, the school had its first Ofsted inspection, when the school was judged to be Good. The inspectors noted that the school benefited from several strong senior and middle leaders who were highly committed and were effectively raising standards across the school; other leaders were not as strong and there was no leadership training. Teaching in the primary phase was weaker than in the secondary phase.

The school was inspected again in 2019 and again judged Good.

References

External links
 Chichester Free School official site

Secondary schools in West Sussex
Educational institutions established in 2013
2013 establishments in England
Free schools in England